Kingsgate may refer to:

Places
 Kingsgate, East Kilbride, Scotland
 Kingsgate, Kent, England, part of Broadstairs
 Kingsgate, Kirkland, Washington
 Kingsgate, Winchester, Hampshire, England
 Kingsgate, British Columbia
 Kingsgate, Dunfermline, an indoor shopping centre located in the town centre of Dunfermline, Fife, Scotland
 Kingsgate, Huddersfield, an indoor shopping centre located in the town centre of Huddersfield, West Yorkshire, England

Other uses
 KingsGate Community Church, a large Christian Church with centres in Peterborough, Cambridge, and Leicester, England
 Kingsgate Consolidated Limited, mining company operating Challenger mine and listed on the ASX as KCN

See also
 King's Gate (disambiguation)